The following is a timeline of the history of the city of Monterrey, Nuevo León, Mexico.

Prior to 20th century

 1560 - Santa Lucia de León founded.
 1584 - Ojos de Santa Lucia outpost established by Spaniards.
 1596 - Settlement named "Ciudad Metropolitana de Nuestra Senora de Monterrey" by Diego de Montemayor and made a city.
 1603 - Cathedral construction begins.
 1730 - Church of San Francisco rebuilt.
 1775 - Population: 258.
 1777 - Monterrey becomes seat of Catholic Linares bishopric.
 1790 - Bishop's Palace built.
 1791 - Monterrey Cathedral building completed.
 1824 - Monterrey becomes capital of Nuevo León state.
 1833 - Cathedral consecrated.
 1846 - Battle of Monterrey - town occupied by United States forces.
 1847 - American Pioneer newspaper begins publication.
 1864 - Town occupied by French forces.
 1866 - French occupation ends.
 1881 - Railway constructed.
 1890 - Cerveceria Cuauhtemoc (brewery) founded.
 1892 - Monterrey News English-language newspaper in publication.
 1896 - 	El Espectador newspaper begins publication.
 1899 - Banco Mercantil de Monterrey established.
 1900 - Population: 62,266.

20th century
 1901 - Monterey and Mexican Gulf Railroad sold.
 1908 - Palacio de Gobierno built.
 1909 - 28 August: Flood.
 1919 - El Porvenir newspaper begins publication.
 1936 - February: Antigovernment demonstration.
 1940 - Population: 190,074.
 1943 - Monterrey Institute of Technology and Higher Education established.
 1945
 Club de Fútbol Monterrey formed.
 Cine Elizondo opens.
 1946 - Iglesia de La Purisima church built.
 1950 - Population: 331,771.
 1960 - Population: 601,086; metro 708,400.
 1969 - Universidad de Monterrey and Universidad Regiomontana established.
 1977 - Monterrey College of Music and Dance established.
 1983 - Galerías Monterrey shopping mall in business.
 1984 - Gran Plaza opens.
 1988
 September: Hurricane Gilbert.
 Plaza Fiesta San Agustín shopping mall in business.
 1990 - Labor Party (Mexico) founded in Monterrey.
 1991 - Monterrey Metro begins operating.

21st century

 2002 - Monterrey Mexico Temple (an LDS Church) dedicated.
 2005 - Paseo San Pedro shopping mall in business.
 2006 - KidZania (leisure centre) in business.
 2010 - Population: 1,135,512; metro 4,089,962.
 2011 - Air pollution in Monterrey reaches annual mean of 36 PM2.5 and 86 PM10, more than recommended.
 2012 - May: Cadereyta Jiménez massacre occurs near city.

See also
 History of Monterrey
 List of municipal presidents of Monterrey
 History of Nuevo León

References

Bibliography
 
 
 
 
 
 
 
 
 
 "Social and Economic Context of Migration to Monterrey, Mexico," in Francine F. Rabinovitz and Felicity M. Trueblood, eds., Latin American Urban Annual, Vol. 1 (Beverly Hills, California: Sage Publications, 1971)
 Alex Saragoza, The Monterrey Elite and the Mexican State, 1880-1940 (Austin, 1988)
 
 Vivienne Bennett. 1995. The Politics of Water: Urban Protest, Gender, and Power in Monterrey, Mexico. Pittsburgh: University of Pittsburgh Press
  (fulltext via OpenLibrary)
 
  (fulltext via OpenLibrary)

External links

  (includes Monterrey )
 Digital Public Library of America. Items related to Monterrey, Mexico, various dates

 
Monterrey